Angel Band is an acoustic collection of gospel songs by Emmylou Harris, released on July 7, 1987.  The album was recorded live "off the floor" featuring a band composed of Vince Gill (mandolin, vocals), Carl Jackson (guitar, vocals) and Emory Gordy Jr. (bass, vocals). Jerry Douglas (dobro) and Mark O'Connor (fiddle) were overdubbed on some tracks.

Track listing

Personnel
 Emmylou Harris – acoustic guitar, arranger, lead vocals

Additional musicians
 Mike Auldridge – dobro
 Jerry Douglas – dobro
 Vince Gill – acoustic guitar, mandolin, tenor vocals
 Emory Gordy Jr. – acoustic guitar, arranger, bass vocals, bass guitar
 Carl Jackson – acoustic guitar, baritone vocals
 Mark O'Connor – fiddle, viola, mandola

Production
 Milan Bogdan – digital editing
 Jim Cotton – engineer
 Alton Dellinger – technical consultant
 Paul Goldberg – engineer
 Patty Loveless – arranger
 McGuire – photography
 Glenn Meadows – mastering
 Jessie Noble – coordination
 Keith Odle – mixing assistant
 Thomas Ryan – design
 Joe Scaife – engineer
 Steve Tillisch – mixing
 David Wariner – lettering

Chart performance

References

Emmylou Harris albums
1987 albums
Albums produced by Emory Gordy Jr.
Warner Records albums